This is a list of the main career statistics of Hungarian professional tennis player Tímea Babos. To date, Babos has won three singles titles and 24 career doubles titles. During her career, she get more recognized by her results in doubles events. Among her doubles titles, there are four Grand Slam doubles titles at the Australian Open in 2018 and 2020 and at the French Open in 2019 and 2020. She also won three WTA Finals doubles titles, as well as, two WTA Premier 5 doubles titles. In addition, she has more significant results in doubles such as: finishing as a runner-ups at Wimbledon in 2014 and 2016, the US Open in 2018 and Australian Open in 2019. Babos gained world No. 1 in doubles on 16 July 2018, while in singles she has peak at the place No. 25 that she achieved in September 2016.

Performance timelines

Only main-draw results in WTA Tour, Grand Slams tournaments, Fed Cup/Billie Jean King Cup and Olympic Games are included in win–loss records.

Singles
Current through the 2021 Hungarian Grand Prix.

Doubles

Significant finals

Grand Slam tournaments

Doubles: 8 (4 titles, 4 runner–ups)

Mixed doubles: 2 (2 runner–ups)

WTA Finals

Doubles: 3 (3 titles)

Premier Mandatory/Premier-5 tournaments

Doubles: 7 (2 titles, 5 runner–ups)

WTA career finals

Singles: 8 (3 titles, 5 runner-ups)

Doubles: 37 (24 titles, 13 runner-ups)

WTA Challenger finals

Singles: 2 (1 title, 1 runner-up)

Doubles: 3 (1 title, 2 runner–ups)

ITF Circuit finals

Singles: 21 (12 titles, 9 runner–ups)

Doubles: 19 (11 titles, 8 runner–ups)

Junior Grand Slam finals

Girls' doubles: 5 (3 titles, 2 runner–ups)

WTA Tour career earnings
As of 1 November 2021

Career Grand Slam statistics

Grand Slam seedings
The tournaments won by Babos are in boldface, and advanced into finals by Babos are in italics.

Singles

Doubles

Wins over top-10 players

Doubles 

Players that were in the top 10 in that moment are in boldface.

Notes

References

External links
 
 
 

Babos, Tímea